Attitti Lake is a lake in the Canadian province of Saskatchewan. It lies in low-relief forested terrain of the Canadian Shield. The climate is sub-arctic.

Location

It can be reached by canoe from Pelican Narrows via Wunehikun Bay and Waskwei Lake, and is connected to most of the surrounding lakes by well-maintained portages.

Terrain

The terrain consists of roughly parallel sinuous ridges of outcrop separated by muskeg, drift and lakes.
The channel that connects Attitti Bay with Attitti Lake is underlain by a north-trending fault zone.
Geologically the area is in the Precambrian Kisseynew complex, underlain by an assemblage of metamorphosed sedimentary rocks that has been intricately folded, with intrusions of sill-like granitic bodies.
Metamorphism in the area appears to have peaked about 1807 million years ago.
There is significant economic potential for volcanogenic massive sulfide and gold mineralization.

The area has parts of three different drainage basins.
Robbestad Lake, McArthur Lake and the northern part of Kakinagimak Lake drain northward into the Churchill River via the Nemei River. 
The southern part of Kakinagimak Lake, and Dezort Lake, Dougherty Lake, Wildnest Lake, and Pearson Lake drain south into the Wildnest-Sturgeon-Weir River System, then into the Saskatchewan River. 
The rest of the area drains into Attitti Lake, which drains eastward through Waskwei Lake, Wunehikun Bay, Mirond Lake and the Sturgeon-Weir River System into the Saskatchewan River System.

Environment

The lake is in the subarctic climate zone.
The lake is surrounded by coniferous forest.
The trees are mainly black spruce (Picea mariana), jack pine (Pinus banksiana), poplar (populus) and scattered balsam (populus balsamifera).
There are small patches of moss-covered muskeg that support laurel (kalmia microphylla), labrador tea, and scattered larch and black spruce.

Animals hunted for meat or fur include moose, woodland caribou, black bear, beaver, otter and muskrat.
Spruce partridge are common.
There is a fly-in fishing lodge on the lake, which has a good population of lake trout, northern pike and walleye.

See also
List of lakes of Saskatchewan

Notes

Sources

Lakes of Saskatchewan